The Bugti are a Baloch tribe.

Bugti may also refer to:

Places
 Bugti Hills
 Dera Bugti

People with the name
 Abdul Raziq Bugti (1952–2007)
 Akbar Bugti (1927–2006)
 Brahamdagh Khan Bugti
 Mir Ali Dost Bugti (1920–1984)
 Salal Bugti (1969–1992)
 Shahbaz Khan Bugti (1897–1989)
 Talal Akbar Bugti (1952–2015)

See also 
 Bugti militia